Cynwyl Elfed (sometimes Conwyl and formerly anglicised as Conwil Elvet or Conwil in Elvet) is a village and community in the county of Carmarthenshire, Wales. The community includes the villages of Cynwyl Elfed, Blaenycoed and Cwmduad.

The area around the village has yielded a significant number of Roman artefacts, including a statue of Diana. It was the most important centre of the commote of Elfed in the Middle Ages.

Cynwyl Elfed transmitting station stands on high ground to the north of the village.

Governance
An electoral ward of the same name exists. This ward stretches south to Newchurch and Merthyr. There is a community council of the same name and also the ward is represented by one councillor in Carmarthenshire County Council. The total population of this ward taken at the 2011 Census was 3,018.

The community is bordered by the communities of: Llangeler; Llanfihangel-ar-Arth; Llanpumsaint; Bronwydd; Newchurch and Merthyr; Abernant; Trelech; and Cenarth, all being in Carmarthenshire.

River 
The River Gwili is a tributary of the River Tywi, the longest river entirely in Wales. Rising to the east of Llanllawddog, in the Brechfa Forest, it runs west, through Llanpumsaint, to its confluence with the River Duad, just south of Cynwyl Elfed village. Then its course turns to the southeast, running through Bronwydd before joining the River Tywi at Abergwili.

Railway 

The Gwili Railway (Welsh: Rheilffordd Gwili) is a Welsh standard gauge heritage railway from the former Abergwili Junction, near Carmarthen, along a short section of the former Carmarthen to Aberystwyth railway that closed for passenger traffic in 1965. Based at Bronwydd Arms railway station, the Gwili Railway currently owns  of the old railway line, which once ran past Cynwyl Elfed.

Roads 
The A484 is an A road from Swansea to Cardigan, and runs through Cynwyl Elfed affording connections to Carmarthen and the A40.

Amenities 

The parish church of St Cynwyl of the Church in Wales, founded in the 6th century, contains 14th century elements and a barrel roof. It is a grade II* listed building.

Cynwyl Elfed has a primary school.

Notable people 
 Howell Elvet Lewis (1860–1953), the Independent minister, hymn-writer, poet, known as Elfed. The house where he was born, 'Y Gangell' is to the west of Cynwyl Elfed near Blaenycoed and contains a small exhibition of his life.
 David Lyn (1927–2012), a Welsh television, film and stage actor; raised on a smallholding in Cynwyl Elfed

External links
 Photos of Cynwyl Elfed and surrounds at Geograph.org.uk

Notes 

Communities in Carmarthenshire
Villages in Carmarthenshire